Elizabeth City Historic District is a national historic district located at Elizabeth City, Pasquotank County, North Carolina. The district encompasses 592 contributing buildings, 1 contributing site, 1 contributing structure, and 1 contributing object in the central business district and surrounds residential sections of Elizabeth City.  The district developed after 1789, and includes representative examples of Greek Revival, Federal, and Late Victorian style architecture. Notable contributing buildings include the Grice-Fearing House (1789-1808), Shirley Armstrong House (c. 1793), Goodman-Matthews-Pool House (c. 1808 - No Longer Extant), Dr. William Martin House (c. 1834), Pool-Kennedy-Lumsden House (c. 1840), Charles-Hussey House (c. 1849), Richardson-Pool House (c. 1860), North Carolina Building (1859), Cobb Building, the former First Methodist Church, Christ Episcopal Church (1857), J. W. Dent House (c. 1915), Dr. Butt's Drug Store (c. 1869-1884), the McMullen Building (c. 1887), the Lowrey Building (c. 1897), former Citizens Bank (c. 1899), Robinson Building (1903), Kramer Building (1909), Selig Building (1925), the Virginia Dare Hotel and Arcade (1927), First Baptist Church (1889), United States Post Office and Courthouse (c. 1906), and Pasquotank County Courthouse (1882).

It was listed on the National Register of Historic Places in 1977, with boundary increases in 1994 and 2021.

References

External links
 
 
 

Historic American Buildings Survey in North Carolina
Historic districts on the National Register of Historic Places in North Carolina
Greek Revival architecture in North Carolina
Victorian architecture in North Carolina
Federal architecture in North Carolina
Buildings and structures in Pasquotank County, North Carolina
National Register of Historic Places in Pasquotank County, North Carolina